Manor and Cottages is a historic resort complex and national historic district located at Asheville, Buncombe County, North Carolina.  The complex encompassed 36 contributing buildings that were built starting in 1898.  The main hotel, The Manor, was built starting in 1898–1899, and consists of a rambling group of interconnected wings with elements of the Colonial Revival, Shingle Style, and Tudor Revival styles.  Wings were added to the original building in 1903 and 1913–1914.  Located on the property are the contributing Club House (c. 1903) and a 19 guest cottages built between 1899 and 1920. The hotel was later converted for use as a retirement hotel for elderly persons with limited incomes.

It was listed on the National Register of Historic Places in 1978.

References

Hotel buildings on the National Register of Historic Places in North Carolina
Historic districts on the National Register of Historic Places in North Carolina
Shingle Style architecture in North Carolina
Colonial Revival architecture in North Carolina
Tudor Revival architecture in North Carolina
Hotels in Asheville, North Carolina
National Register of Historic Places in Buncombe County, North Carolina